Unión Deportiva Gáldar is a Spanish football team based in Gáldar, Las Palmas, in the autonomous community of Canary Islands. Founded in 1988 it plays in Preferente de Las Palmas, holding home matches at Estadio Barrial, with a capacity of 5,000 seats.

Season to season

3 seasons in Segunda División B
16 seasons in Tercera División

Famous players
 Jon Bakero
 Jordi Ocaña
 Kiko Ratón
 Federico Fuentes
 Luis Reyes
 Juan Carlos Socorro

External links
Futbolme team profile 
Regional Preferente de Las Palmas 

Football clubs in the Canary Islands
Sport in Gran Canaria
Association football clubs established in 1988
Divisiones Regionales de Fútbol clubs
1988 establishments in Spain